SETU may refer to:

Acronyms 
South East Technological University, a technological university in the south east of Ireland
Teniente Coronel Luis A. Mantilla International Airport, an airport in Tulcán, Ecuador, with the ICAO code SETU

Places 
Setu means bridge in Sanskrit and other Indian languages and may refer to the following bridges constructed in India:

Assam 
 Dhola–Sadiya Bridge or Bhupen Hazarika Setu, between Assam and Arunachal Pradesh
 Kolia Bhomora Setu
 Naranarayan Setu

Bihar 
 Arrah–Chhapra Bridge or Veer Kunwar Singh Setu
 Digha–Sonpur Bridge or J.P. Setu
 Mahatma Gandhi Setu
 Rajendra Setu
 Vikramshila Setu

Gujarat 
 Morarji Desai Setu
 Sudama Setu

West Bengal 
 Bijon Setu, Kolkata
 Farakka Setu
 Howrah Bridge or Rabindra Setu, Kolkata
 Ishwar Gupta Setu
 Jangalkanya Setu
 Joyee Setu
 Maitri Setu, between India and Bangladesh
 Matla Setu
 Netaji Subhas Chandra Bose Setu
 Vidyasagar Setu
 Vivekananda Setu, Kolkata
 Second Vivekananda Bridge or Second Vivekananda Setu, Kolkata
 Tala Bridge or Tala Setu, Kolkata

Others 
 Adam's Bridge or Rama's Setu, chain of shoals off the coast of India and Sri Lanka, identified with the bridge in Ramayana
 Sethusamudram Shipping Canal Project or Setu Samudram, proposed canal at the above
 Atal Setu, Goa
 Atal Setu, Jammu and Kashmir
 Atal Setu, Sikkim
 Bandra–Worli Sea Link or Rajiv Gandhi Setu, Mumbai
 Kaman Aman Setu, Jammu and Kashmir, between India and Pakistan
 Utkal Gourab Madhusudan Setu, Odisha

Others 
Aarogya Setu, COVID-19 contact tracing mobile application in India
Bijon Setu massacre, 1982 murder of monks and a nun in Kolkata, India
Setu Bandha Sarvangasana, inverted back-bending posture in yoga
Setu Bharatam, Indian highway project
Setu coins, ancient coinage from India and Sri Lanka
Sethu Lakshmi Bayi or Setu Lakshmi Bayi (r. 1924–1931), Indian queen, maharani of Travancore
Setumadhavarao Pagadi or Setu Madhavrao Pagdi, Indian historian
Rama Setu (Ramayana), a bridge built by Rama as described in the Ramayana
Sethubandhanam, another term for the above

See also 
 Sethu (disambiguation)
 Sethubandhanam (disambiguation)
 Sethupathi (disambiguation)
 Adams Bridge (disambiguation)